There are many different types of cells in the human body.

Cells derived primarily from endoderm

Exocrine secretory epithelial cells 
Brunner's gland cell in duodenum (enzymes and alkaline mucus)
Insulated goblet cell of respiratory and digestive tracts (mucus secretion)
Stomach
Foveolar cell (mucus secretion)
Chief cell (pepsinogen secretion)
Parietal cell (hydrochloric acid secretion)
Pancreatic acinar cell (bicarbonate and digestive enzyme secretion)
Paneth cell of small intestine (lysozyme secretion)
Type II pneumocyte of lung (surfactant secretion)
Club cell of lung

Barrier cells

Hormone-secreting cells
Enteroendocrine cell
K cell (secretes gastric inhibitory peptide)
L cell (secretes glucagon-like peptide-1,  peptide YY3-36, oxyntomodulin, and glucagon-like peptide-2)
I cell (secretes cholecystokinin (CCK))
G cell (secretes gastrin)
Enterochromaffin cell (secretes serotonin)
Enterochromaffin-like cell (secretes histamine)
N cell (secretes neurotensin)
S cell (secretes secretin)
D cell (secretes somatostatin)
Mo cell (or M cell) (secretes motilin)
other hormones secreted: vasoactive intestinal peptide, substance P, alpha and gamma-endorphin, bombesin
Thyroid gland cells
 Thyroid epithelial cell
 Parafollicular cell
Parathyroid gland cells
 Parathyroid chief cell
 Oxyphil cell
Pancreatic islets (islets of Langerhans)
Alpha cell (secretes glucagon)
Beta cell (secretes insulin and amylin)
Delta cell (secretes somatostatin)
Epsilon cell (secretes ghrelin)
PP cell (gamma cell) (secretes pancreatic polypeptide)

Cells derived primarily from ectoderm

Exocrine secretory epithelial cells 
Salivary gland mucous cell
Salivary gland serous cell
Von Ebner's gland cell in tongue (washes taste buds)
Mammary gland cell (milk secretion)
Lacrimal gland cell (tear secretion)
Ceruminous gland cell in ear (earwax secretion)
Eccrine sweat gland dark cell (glycoprotein secretion)
Eccrine sweat gland clear cell (small molecule secretion)
Apocrine sweat gland cell (odoriferous secretion, sex-hormone sensitive)
Gland of Moll cell in eyelid (specialized sweat gland)
Sebaceous gland cell (lipid-rich sebum secretion)
Bowman's gland cell in nose (washes olfactory epithelium)

Hormone-secreting cells
Anterior/Intermediate pituitary cells
 Corticotropes
 Gonadotropes
 Lactotropes
 Melanotropes
 Somatotropes
 Thyrotropes
Magnocellular neurosecretory cells, secrete oxytocin and vasopressin
Parvocellular neurosecretory cells, secrete thyrotropin-releasing hormone (TRH), corticotropin-releasing hormone (CRH), vasopressin, oxytocin, neurotensin, and prolactin
 Chromaffin cells (adrenal gland)

Epithelial cells
Keratinocyte (differentiating epidermal cell) 
Epidermal basal cell (stem cell)
Melanocyte
Trichocyte (gives rise to hair and nail cells)
Medullary hair shaft cell
Cortical hair shaft cell
Cuticular hair shaft cell
Huxley's layer hair root sheath cell
Henle's layer hair root sheath cell
Outer root sheath hair cell
Surface epithelial cell of cornea, tongue, mouth, nasal cavity, distal anal canal, distal urethra, and distal vagina
basal cell (stem cell) of cornea, tongue, mouth, nasal cavity, distal anal canal, distal urethra, and distal vagina
Intercalated duct cell (salivary glands)
Striated duct cell (salivary glands)
Lactiferous duct cell (mammary glands)
Ameloblast (deposit tooth enamel)

Oral cells
Odontoblast (tooth dentin formation)
Cementoblast (tooth cementum formation)

Nervous system
There are nerve cells, also known as neurons, present in our human body. They are branched out. These cells make up nervous tissue.
A neuron consists of a cell body with a nucleus and cytoplasm, from which long thin hair-like parts arise.

Sensory transducer cells
Auditory inner hair cells of organ of Corti
Auditory outer hair cells of organ of Corti
Basal cells of olfactory epithelium (stem cell for olfactory neurons)
Cold-sensitive primary sensory neurons
Heat-sensitive primary sensory neurons
Merkel cells of epidermis 
Olfactory receptor neurons
Pain-sensitive primary sensory neurons 
Photoreceptor cells of retina in eye:
Photoreceptor rod cells
Photoreceptor blue-sensitive cone cells of eye
Photoreceptor green-sensitive cone cells of eye
Photoreceptor red-sensitive cone cells of eye
Proprioceptive primary sensory neurons
Touch-sensitive primary sensory neurons 
Chemoreceptor glomus cells of carotid body cell (blood pH sensor)
 Outer hair cells of vestibular system of ear (acceleration and gravity)
 Inner hair cells of vestibular system of ear (acceleration and gravity)
 Taste receptor cells of taste bud

Autonomic neuron cells
Cholinergic neurons (various types)
Adrenergic neural cells (various types)
Peptidergic neural cells (various types)

Sense organ and peripheral neuron supporting cells
Inner pillar cells of organ of Corti
Outer pillar cells of the organ of Corti
Inner phalangeal cells of organ of Corti
Outer phalangeal cells of organ of Corti
Border cells of organ of Corti
Hensen's cells of organ of Corti
Vestibular apparatus supporting cells
Taste bud supporting cells
Olfactory epithelium supporting cells
Olfactory ensheathing cells
Schwann cells
Satellite glial cells
Enteric glial cells

Central nervous system neurons and glial cells
Neuron cells (large variety of types, still poorly classified)
Interneurons
 Basket cells
 Cartwheel cells
 Stellate cells
 Golgi cells
 Granule cells
 Lugaro cells
 Unipolar brush cells
 Martinotti cells
 Chandelier cells
 Cajal–Retzius cells
 Double-bouquet cells
 Neurogliaform cells
 Retina horizontal cells
 Amacrine cells
 Starburst amacrine cells
 Spinal interneurons
 Renshaw cells
Principal cells
Spindle neurons
Fork neurons
Pyramidal cells
Place cells
Grid cells
Speed cells
Head direction cells
Betz cells
Stellate cells
Boundary cells
Bushy cells
Purkinje cells
Medium spiny neurons
Astrocytes
Oligodendrocytes
Ependymal cells
Tanycytes
Pituicytes

Lens cells
Anterior lens epithelial cell
Crystallin-containing lens fiber cell

Cells derived primarily from mesoderm

Metabolism and storage cells
Adipocytes:
White fat cell
Brown fat cell
Liver lipocyte

Secretory cells
Cells of the Adrenal cortex
Cells of the Zona glomerulosa produce mineralocorticoids
Cells of the Zona fasciculata produce glucocorticoids
Cells of the Zona reticularis produce androgens
Theca Interna cell of ovarian follicle secreting estrogen
Corpus luteum cell of ruptured ovarian follicle secreting progesterone
Granulosa lutein cells
Theca lutein cells
Leydig cell of testes secreting testosterone
Seminal vesicle cell (secretes seminal fluid components, including fructose for swimming sperm)
Prostate gland cell (secretes seminal fluid components)
Bulbourethral gland cell (mucus secretion)
Bartholin's gland cell (vaginal lubricant secretion)
Gland of Littre cell (mucus secretion)
Uterus endometrium cell (carbohydrate secretion)
Juxtaglomerular cell (renin secretion)
Macula densa cell of kidney
Peripolar cell of kidney
Mesangial cell of kidney

Barrier cells

Urinary system
Parietal epithelial cell
Podocyte
Proximal tubule brush border cell
Loop of Henle thin segment cell
Kidney distal tubule cell
Kidney collecting duct cell
Principal cell
Intercalated cell
Transitional epithelium (lining urinary bladder)

Reproductive system
Duct cell (of seminal vesicle, prostate gland, etc.)
Efferent ducts cell
Epididymal principal cell
Epididymal basal cell

Circulatory system
Endothelial cells

Extracellular matrix cells
Planum semilunar epithelial cell of vestibular system of ear (proteoglycan secretion)
Organ of Corti interdental epithelial cell (secreting tectorial membrane covering hair cells)
Loose connective tissue fibroblasts
Corneal fibroblasts (corneal keratocytes)
Tendon fibroblasts
Bone marrow reticular tissue fibroblasts
Other nonepithelial fibroblasts
Pericyte
Hepatic stellate cell (Ito cell)
Nucleus pulposus cell of intervertebral disc
Hyaline cartilage chondrocyte
Fibrocartilage chondrocyte
Elastic cartilage chondrocyte
Osteoblast/osteocyte
Osteoprogenitor cell (stem cell of osteoblasts)
Hyalocyte of vitreous body of eye
Stellate cell of perilymphatic space of the ear
Pancreatic stellate cell

Note: Cephalic connective tissue and bones are derived from the Cranial neural crest which comes from the ectoderm germ layer

Contractile cells
Skeletal muscle cells
Red skeletal muscle cell (slow twitch)
White skeletal muscle cell (fast twitch)
Intermediate skeletal muscle cell
Nuclear bag cell of muscle spindle
Nuclear chain cell of muscle spindle
Myosatellite cell (stem cell)
Cardiac muscle cells
Cardiac muscle cell
SA node cell
Purkinje fiber cell
Smooth muscle cell (various types)
Myoepithelial cell of iris
Myoepithelial cell of exocrine glands

Blood and immune system cells

Germ cells (primordially not)

Nurse cell

Interstitial cells

See also 
List of human cell types derived from the germ layers

References

External links

Human Cell Atlas

Histology
Cell types